William Ely (August 14, 1765 – October 9, 1817) was a U.S. Representative from Massachusetts.

Early life and education
Ely was born in Longmeadow in the Province of Massachusetts Bay on August 14, 1765. He was the youngest son of Deacon Nathaniel Ely (1716–1799) and Abigail (Colton) Ely (1724–1770); his mother died when he was 5.

Ely completed preparatory studies. He was graduated from Yale College in 1787. He studied law. Ely was admitted to the bar in 1791.

Career
Following this, Ely commenced practice in Springfield, Massachusetts.

Ely served as a member of the Massachusetts House of Representatives from 1801–1803.

Ely married Abigail Bliss about November 1, 1803.

Ely was elected as a Federalist to the Ninth and to the four succeeding Congresses (March 4, 1805 – March 3, 1815).

Ely was again a member of the Massachusetts House of Representatives in 1814 and 1816.

Death
Ely died on October 9, 1817, in Springfield, Massachusetts; his wife survived him but died in 1827. They are buried in Springfield Cemetery.

References

External links

William Ely entry at The Political Graveyard
 and also here

1765 births
1817 deaths
People from Longmeadow, Massachusetts
Members of the Massachusetts House of Representatives
Yale College alumni
Federalist Party members of the United States House of Representatives from Massachusetts